The 1928 South Carolina Gamecocks football team was an American football team that represented the University of South Carolina as a member of the Southern Conference (SoCon) during the 1928 college football season. Led by first-year head coach Billy Laval, the Gamecocks compiled an overall record of 6–2–2 with a mark of 2–2–1 in conference play, placing 15th in the SoCon.

Schedule

References

South Carolina
South Carolina Gamecocks football seasons
South Carolina Gamecocks football